Holy Cross High School is a coeducational Catholic high school located in Louisville, Kentucky, United States.

Notable alumni
 Ben Rhodes (2015)NASCAR driver

References

Roman Catholic schools in Louisville, Kentucky
Catholic secondary schools in Kentucky
Educational institutions established in 1984
1984 establishments in Kentucky
High schools in Louisville, Kentucky